Erna Bogen-Bogáti (31 December 1906 – 23 November 2002) was a Hungarian fencer. She won a bronze medal in the women's individual foil event at the 1932 Summer Olympics. She was the daughter of Hungarian Albert Bogen, who competed for Austria at the 1912 Summer Olympics (winning a silver medal in team sabre) and for Hungary at the 1928 Summer Olympics. She was the wife of the Hungarian fencer Aladár Gerevich and mother of Olympic medalist Pál Gerevich.

References

External links
 

1906 births
2002 deaths
Hungarian female foil fencers
Olympic fencers of Hungary
Fencers at the 1928 Summer Olympics
Fencers at the 1932 Summer Olympics
Fencers at the 1936 Summer Olympics
Olympic bronze medalists for Hungary
Olympic medalists in fencing
People from Jarosław
People from the Kingdom of Galicia and Lodomeria
Sportspeople from Podkarpackie Voivodeship
Medalists at the 1932 Summer Olympics
20th-century Hungarian women